National Highway 701A, commonly referred to as NH 701A, is a national highway in India. It is a secondary route of National Highway 1.  NH-701A runs in the state of Jammu and Kashmir in India.

Route description 
NH701A connects Baramulla and Gulmarg in the state of Jammu and Kashmir.

Major intersections 
 
  Terminal near Baramulla.

See also 
 List of National Highways in India
 List of National Highways in India by state

References

External links 

 NH 701A on OpenStreetMap

National highways in India
National Highways in Jammu and Kashmir
Transport in Baramulla